Progressive Valdostan Union may refer to:
Progressive Valdostan Union, a political party active between 1973 and 1984.
Progressive Valdostan Union, a political party founded in 2013.